Peter Millar is a Scottish-American retired soccer forward.  He spent nine seasons in the second American Soccer League, one in the North American Soccer League and four in the German American Soccer League.  He also earned thirteen caps, scoring eight goals, with the U.S. national team between 1968 and 1972.

National team
Millar earned thirteen caps for the U.S. national team between 1968 and 1972, scoring 8 goals (or 9 depending on the sources) during that time.  He made an auspicious debut with the team by scoring a hat trick in a September 15, 1968 tie with Israel.  Some records only attribute 2 goals to Millar as he and Willy Roy apparently kicked the ball nearly simultaneously which leads to the discrepancy in his stats.

International Goals

See also
List of United States men's international soccer players born outside the United States

References

External links
 Soccer Hall of Fame Eligibility Bio

American soccer players
American Soccer League (1933–1983) players
Baltimore Bays players
German-American Soccer League players
Inter SC players
Inter-Brooklyn Italians players
North American Soccer League (1968–1984) players
United States men's international soccer players
Living people
Association football forwards
Year of birth missing (living people)
Scottish emigrants to the United States